Little York may refer to:

Little York, California, USA
Little York, Illinois, USA
Little York, Indiana, USA
Little York, Hunterdon County, New Jersey
Little York, Ohio a part of Butler Township, Montgomery County, Ohio
Little York Road, a street in Houston, Texas, USA